Flowell is an unincorporated community in Millard County, Utah, United States.

Geography
Utah State Route 100 connects Flowell with Fillmore to the east, and with U.S. Route 50 to the north. Just west of Flowell is the Ice Springs lava flow, part of the Black Rock Desert volcanic field, and a location that had an eruption less than 1,000 years ago.

History

In July 1915, Brigham Tomkinson drilled the first successful artesian well west of Fillmore, turning worthless desert into rich farmland and setting off a wave of well drilling in eastern Millard County. The center of this activity was first named Crystal, then Flowell after the freely-flowing wells. A school was built in 1919, and a post office in 1922. In the 1930s, Flowell built a community recreation hall with federal assistance from the Works Progress Administration.

References

External links

1915 establishments in Utah
Populated places established in 1915
Unincorporated communities in Millard County, Utah
Unincorporated communities in Utah
Great Basin National Heritage Area